Aline Creek is a tributary of North Branch Mahantango Creek in Snyder County, Pennsylvania, in the United States. The creek has no named tributaries, but does have one unnamed tributary. A reach of Aline Creek is designated as an impaired waterbody due to siltation/sedimentation from agriculture and removal of vegetation. The creek's drainage basin is designated as a Coldwater Fishery and a Migratory Fishery.

Course
Aline Creek begins on a hill in Perry Township. It flows east-southeast for several tenths of a mile and enters a valley. It then turns northeast for several tenths of a mile before receiving an unnamed tributary from the left and soon afterwards turning east-northeast. After several tenths of a mile, the creek reaches the end of its valley and turns east. A short distance further downstream, it reaches its confluence with North Branch Mahantango Creek.

Tributaries
Aline Creek has no named tributaries.

Hydrology, geography and geology

A reach of Aline Creek is designated as an impaired waterbody. The cause of the impairment is sedimentation/siltation and the likely sources of impairment are agriculture and removal of vegetation.

Watershed and biology
The mouth of the creek is in the United States Geological Survey quadrangle of Dalmatia. However, its source is in the quadrangle of Richfield. Its mouth is located within  of Troutwell.

The drainage basin of Aline Creek is designated as a Coldwater Fishery and a Migratory Fishery. The designated use of the creek is aquatic life.

History
Aline Creek was entered into the Geographic Names Information System on August 2, 1979. Its identifier in the Geographic Names Information System is 1168153.

A bridge carrying State Route 3016 over Aline Creek has been proposed for replacement.

See also
List of rivers of Pennsylvania

References

Rivers of Snyder County, Pennsylvania
Tributaries of the Susquehanna River
Rivers of Pennsylvania